The Cleddau River is a river of New Zealand. It flows into the head of Milford Sound.

See also
List of rivers of New Zealand

References
Land Information New Zealand - Search for Place Names

Rivers of Fiordland